Scriptures is the second studio album by American rapper Tee Grizzley. It was released on June 7, 2019, by 300 Entertainment. Executive-produced by Timbaland, it features guest appearances from YNW Melly and A Boogie wit da Hoodie, and was supported by three singles: "God's Warrior", "Locked Up" and "Sweet Thangs".

Commercial performance
Scriptures debuted at number 20 on the US Billboard 200 dated June 17, 2019, with 20,524 album-equivalent units (including 1248 pure album sales).

Track listing
Adapted from Spotify.

Charts

References

2019 albums
Albums produced by Timbaland
Tee Grizzley albums